The rivière des Renards (in English: river of foxes) is a tributary of the south bank of the rivière du Barrage which flows on the south bank of the Samson River.

Toponymy 
The toponym "rivière des Renards" was made official on February 28, 1980, at the Commission de toponymie du Québec.

See also 

 List of rivers of Quebec

References 

Rivers of Estrie
Le Granit Regional County Municipality